The All-CCHA Teams are composed of players at all positions from teams that are members of the Central Collegiate Hockey Association, an NCAA Division I hockey-only conference that first existed from 1971 to 2013 and was revived in 2021. Each year, from 1972–73 through 2012–13 and since 2021–22, at the conclusion of the CCHA regular season the head coaches of each member team vote for players to be placed on each all-conference team. The First Team and Second Team were named in every CCHA season after the inaugural year while the Rookie Team was added starting in 1988–89. The all-CCHA teams were discontinued after the 2012–13 season when the original CCHA was dissolved as a consequence of the Big Ten Conference forming its men's ice hockey conference, and were revived along with the league in 2021–22.

In February 2020, seven schools that had announced in 2019 that they would leave the Western Collegiate Hockey Association after that league's 2020–21 season announced that they would revive the CCHA, with league play starting in 2021–22. Four of these seven schools—Bowling Green, Ferris State, Lake Superior State, and Northern Michigan—played in the final season of the original CCHA. A fifth member of the revived league, Michigan Tech, was briefly a CCHA member in the early 1980s.

The all-conference teams are composed of one goaltender, two defensemen and three forwards. If a tie occurs for the final selection at any position, both players are included as part of the all-conference team; if a tie results in an increase in the number of First Team all-stars, the Second Team is reduced in numbers accordingly (as happened in 1974–75 and 2010–11). Players may only appear once per year on any of the first or second teams but freshmen may appear on both the rookie team and one of the other all-conference teams.

All-conference teams

First Team

1970s

1980s

1990s

2000s

2010s

2020s

First Team players by school

Current CCHA Teams

Former CCHA Teams

Multiple appearances

Second Team

1970s

1980s

1990s

2000s

2010s

2020s

Second Team players by school

Current CCHA Teams

Former CCHA Teams

Multiple appearances

Rookie Team

1980s

1990s

2000s

2010s

2020s

Rookie Team players by school

Current CCHA Teams

Former CCHA Teams

See also
CCHA Awards

References

External links
CCHA All-Star Team (Incomplete)
CCHA All-Conference Team (Incomplete)
CCHA All-Rookie Team (Incomplete)

College ice hockey trophies and awards in the United States